Iota Phi Theta Fraternity, Inc. is a historically African American fraternity. It was founded on September 19, 1963, at Morgan State University (then Morgan State College) in Baltimore, Maryland, and is currently the 5th largest Black Greek Lettered Fraternity. Members of the close-knit afrocentric fraternity proudly embrace the organization’s youth, uniqueness, individualism (stereotyping discouraged) and modern idealism. As a contemporary organization, many members have had the great honor of meeting, fellowshipping with and/or engaging in personal or virtual discussions with one or more of their founders.  Today there are over 301 undergraduate and alumni chapters (including colonies), as well as colonies located in 40 U.S. states, the District of Columbia, The Bahamas, Colombia, South Korea, and Japan.

The fraternity holds membership in the National Pan-Hellenic Council (NPHC), an umbrella organization commonly referred to as the Divine 9 which is composed of international historically African American Greek letter sororities and fraternities. The fraternity also holds membership in the North American Interfraternity Conference (NIC).

History

The fraternity was founded by 12 men (giving the organization the distinction of having more founders than any other NPHC fraternity) — Albert Hicks, Lonnie Spruill Jr., Charles Briscoe, Frank Coakley, John Slade, Barron Willis, Webster Lewis, Charles Brown, Louis Hudnell, Charles Gregory, Elias Dorsey Jr. and Michael Williams — during the Civil Rights Movement. On September 19, 1963, the twelve founders gathered together on the steps of Hurt Gymnasium on the campus of Morgan State College (now Morgan State University) and unyielding desired & agreed to form Iota Phi Theta Fraternity, Inc., a support system for militant men of color in the era's turbulent social climate. At the time of the fraternity's founding, several NPHC organizations “existed on Morgan State’s campus”. Many new organizations devoted to the plight of African Americans arose during the 1960s. Like those organizations, Iota Phi Theta's founders were extremely devoted to Civil Rights and energizing the movement. Many early members of the fraternity were also actively involved in the Black Power and Pan-Africanism Movements, both begun due to perceived and actual failures of Civil Rights Movement initiatives. Influencers of Iota Phi Theta include organizations such as the Black Panthers, SNCC, the original Rainbow Coalition (Fred Hampton) and individuals like Malcolm X and Stokely Carmichael.

Additionally, unlike most of their fraternity peers, the founders were all non-traditional students. Many were long-time friends. Spruill, Coakley, Dorsey, and Gregory had known one another since grade school, and Spruill and Coakley had been friends since pre-school. Many of them were three to five years older, worked and attended classes full time, had served in the military and had families with small children. Based upon their ages, heightened responsibilities and increased level of maturity, the group had a slightly different perspective than the norm for typical fraternity members. It was this perspective from which they established the Fraternity's purpose, "The development and perpetuation of Scholarship, Leadership, Citizenship, Fidelity, and Brotherhood among Men." Additionally, they conceived the Fraternity's motto, "Building a Tradition, Not Resting Upon One!". While the Greek mythological creature, the Centaur, has a well known public meaning, a beloved alternate description of the Centaur is known only by initiated members of the fraternity.

Early activism – Northwood Theater

While the 1950s was an era of conformity, the 1960s was an era of resistance. In the 60s many African Americans began forming organizations based on their passion for social change and their alignment with the principles of the Civil Rights Movement. The fraternity was among these groups. Brothers participated in various protests and sit-ins throughout Baltimore to fight racial segregation. The earliest was a protest organized with a civic interest group, composed mostly of Morgan State College students, against the theater at Northwood Shopping Center in Baltimore, Maryland, located diagonally across the street from Morgan State College. Northwood continued to segregate its services, affecting thousands of students at the historically black college. In many theaters, only white people could occupy seating on the main floor, while black people were restricted to the "Jim Crow" balcony, often with a separate ticket booth and entrance.

This protest started February 15, 1963, and over the course of the six days, the total number of picketers involved reached 1500, and over 400 individuals were arrested. The protest took place in the context of a longer history of protests against the theater's white-only policy. Annual demonstrations against the theater had been held since 1955, including a sit-in at Northwood and picketing downtown. The theater was a last holdout of racial segregation in the blocks surrounding the college. On February 22, 1963, the theater capitulated to student demands and ended its white-only policy. It was during this time that future Iota men decidedly became advocates for marginalized people and their communities.

Incorporation, philanthropy, and growth
The fraternity functioned as a local entity until the first interest groups were established in 1967 at Hampton Institute (Beta Chapter) and Delaware State College (Gamma Chapter). Further expansion took place in 1968, with chapters formed at Norfolk State College (Delta Chapter) and Jersey City State College (Epsilon Chapter). The fraternity was legally incorporated on November 1, 1968, as a national fraternity under the laws of the State of Maryland. Zeta Chapter (North Carolina A&T State University) was founded in spring 1969.

1963 was a defining year in the United States. President John F. Kennedy was assassinated in Dallas, Texas; civil rights’ protests continued throughout the South, during which nonviolent activists were frequently met with beatings and arrests; 4 young girls were killed during the 16th Street Baptist Church bombing; over 200,000 people marched on Washington in support of civil rights; Kenya gained its independence; Medger Evers, NAACP field secretary, and civil rights leader, was assassinated at his home in Jackson, Mississippi by a segregationist; Unemployment reached 6.1 percent, etc.

Throughout the 1960s and 1970s, the fraternity supported local social service programs including the Big Brothers of America. In 1974, the then Grand Polaris, Thomas Dean, appeared in a local television commercial on behalf of Big Brothers of America. The fraternity continues to support service initiatives with national organizations such as the NAACP, the United Negro College Fund, the National Sickle Cell Disease Foundation, St. Jude Children's Research Hospital, the American Red Cross, the Southern Christian Leadership Conference, the National Institutes of Health All of Us (initiative), the National Federation of the Blind, the Inroads (organization) and the United States Army. Additionally the fraternity’s chapters continue to support and lead Iota’s own initiatives: I-S.H.I.E.L.D, the I.O.T.A. (“Intelligent, Outstanding Talented Achievers”) Youth Alliance, the Iota Phi Theta Men’s Health Program, I-PhiT ("Impact Others Through Awareness by Implementing Public Health Initiatives Throughout the World"), the #MuchMoreThanAHashtag Program and Project IMAGE.

Originally, the organization’s members had no aspiration of national or international recognition. The first steps toward moving the fraternity from a regional to a national scope were taken with the creation of Upsilon Chapter at Southern Illinois University in 1974. It was also during this period that the fraternity's first four graduate chapters were formed across the South and the East Coast, which created a base for the organization in the Northeast, Southeast, Mid-Atlantic, and Midwest regions of the country. The next regional expansion occurred in 1983 with the establishment of the Alpha Chi (San Francisco State University) and Xi Omega (San Francisco Bay Area Alumni Chapter) in California.

Joining the NIC and NPHC 
While eventually joining the National Pan-Hellenic Council (NPHC) was an important objective for some members, it was not an objective for the fraternity as a whole. The fraternity prioritized entering an affiliation that would provide resources and relationships essential for Iota's long-term growth and development. With that in mind, Iota Phi Theta successfully petitioned for membership in the North American Interfraternity Conference (NIC; a federation of 69 North American men's fraternities) in 1985. Iota Phi Theta became the second historically African American fraternity to join the NIC and remains one of only four historically African American fraternities which are NIC members.

While its NIC membership was and is beneficial, later Iota began contact with the NPHC, which at the time had no expansion policy with which to accept new members. At its 1993 national convention, the NPHC adopted a constitutional amendment which provided for expansion, and years later, a NPHC expansion committee developed criteria for potential new member organizations and a procedure by which they might apply.

In 1996, Iota Phi Theta submitted a formal application to the NPHC expansion committee for review, after which it was delivered to the NPHC Executive Board. After deliberation, the board unanimously approved Iota Phi Theta's membership application. Effective November 12, 1996, Iota Phi Theta was accepted as a full member of the National Pan-Hellenic Council, with all its rights, privileges, and responsibilities. To commemorate Iota's entry, the NPHC conducted a formal induction ceremony at its February 1997 leadership conference. This ceremony was attended by hundreds of Iota men, including the Grand Council and a number of the fraternity's founders, as well as hundreds of well-wishers and supporters from the NPHC community.

1990s to 2000s and international expansion 
In 1992, the fraternity established the National Iota Foundation, Inc., a tax-exempt entity that grants scholarships and other financial assistance to those in need. Since its creation, the foundation has distributed over $250,000 in programs and services.

The fraternity became an international entity with the establishment of a colony in Nassau, Bahamas in 1999, military chapters in South Korea (Alpha Rho Omega, 2005) and Japan (Beta Pi Omega, 2009), and Theta Mu (The Diego Luis Cordoba Tech University of Choco; Quibdó, Chocó, Colombia, South America, 2013). Fraternity leaders, strategists and alumni chapters created networking channels to ensure its members were afforded opportunities previously reserved for members of older larger organizations only. The internal processes are catalyst for gaining access and influence in business, politics, higher education, entertainment, healthcare, law, etc. Qualifying based on a number of years of existence, Iota Phi Theta has grown at a faster pace than all other Black Greek Letter Fraternities. , there have been over 30,000 members initiated in the US and overseas. Traditionally, only the fraternity's members display its name "Iota Phi Theta", letters , and shield in Charcoal Brown (PMS 469) and Gilded Gold (PMS 871 Metallic).

In 2012, Iota Phi Theta was ranked No. 20 on Newsweeks "Top 25 Fraternities" list. September 19, 2013 marked the fraternity's 50th anniversary. After the fraternity’s 50th anniversary, fraternity members aligned themselves with the Black Lives Matter (BLM) Movement. The fraternity and BLM maintain similar stances that societal inequalities and injustices must permanently end across the United States. In 2016 the Alpha and Gamma Omega Omega Chapters, both located in Baltimore, MD, pledged an endowment of $100,000 to Morgan State University’s Scholarship Fund. The fraternity gifted $100,000 to the National Museum of African American History. The fraternity also donated official vintage merchandise to the museum which opened on September 24, 2016. In 2020 the Beta Omega Washington, DC Alumni Chapter (in conjunction with Beta Omega Social Services) awarded $55,000 in scholarship funds to high achieving (many underprivileged) college-bound youth.

In May 2020, Iota's president and other NPHC fraternities and sororities' presidents, formally called for the filing of criminal charges against police officers involved in the murder of George Floyd. On May 29, Iota's leadership and other NPHC organizations' leadership, accepted an invitation to begin a series of meetings with then-presidential candidate Joe Biden regarding the highest priorities facing Black America. Also in 2020 Brother and Congressman Bobby Rush successfully passed the Emmett Till Antilynching Act (a bill he introduced in 2019) to the United States House of Representatives. The act was eventually signed into law on March 29, 2022, and remains a landmark achievement.

Leadership 
Iota Phi Theta is led by a Grand Council with a Grand Polaris at its head.

Grand Polari (1963–present):

Programs and initiatives
Iota Phi Theta has a publication and several affiliated programs. The Centaur magazine is the official publication of the Iota Phi Theta Fraternity, Inc. First published as a newsletter, the Centaur is now published biannually.

Audrey Brooks and Iota Sweethearts 

In the early growth and development of the fraternity, Morgan State College staff member Audrey Brooks assisted the Brothers and became a vital resource to Iota Phi Theta, providing protection and support for the fledgling organization. In recognition of her support, the fraternity granted Ms. Brooks the title of "Eternal Sweetheart". Brooks continued to support Iota Phi Theta through her life and was a frequent guest at Iota conclaves and workshops until her passing in 2003. The Iota Sweetheart Auxiliary was formed soon after in her honor and has become a fraternity tradition. During a Sweetheart Workshop held during the 1999 Iota Phi Theta Conclave in Oakland, California, Ms. Brooks stated, "The Purpose of Iota Sweethearts is to smile and be gracious on behalf of Iota. Anything else is inappropriate," which became the philosophical foundation of the Sweetheart Auxiliary.

The Iota Sweethearts, Inc. (ISI) was founded in September 2014 to reorganize the Iota Phi Theta Sweetheart Auxiliary, which the fraternity then dissolved in January 2015.  In October 2015, ISI and the fraternity signed an agreement which officially formalized the historical relationship between the organizations.

Chapters

Notable Members

Media and Entertainment

Business and Technology

Military and Public Service

Academia

Athletics

See also
List of social fraternities and sororities

References

External links
Iota Phi Theta - official website

Further reading
 

Student organizations established in 1963
International student societies
Morgan State University
Student societies in the United States
North American Interfraternity Conference
National Pan-Hellenic Council
African-American fraternities and sororities
1963 establishments in Maryland